May Fairy Tale is a 1940 Czechoslovak drama film directed by Otakar Vávra.

Cast
 Nataša Gollová as Helenka
 Jaroslav Vojta as Helena's father
 Leopolda Dostalová as Helena's aunt Marta
 Svatopluk Beneš as Ríša Gregor
 Theodor Pištěk as Ríša's father
 Marie Blažková as Ríša's mother
 Jaroslav Průcha as Priest
 Vlasta Fabianová as Landlady Křížová

References

External links
 

1940 films
1940 drama films
1940s Czech-language films
Czechoslovak black-and-white films
Films directed by Otakar Vávra
Czechoslovak drama films
1940s Czech films